Rai Way is an Italian listed company that owns the broadcasting infrastructure of state-owned RAI TV station. Its shares are traded into the FTSE Italia Mid Cap Index.

In 2015, EI Towers launched a hostile takeover bid for €1.2 billion; however, Italian law required RAI to hold at least 51% shares of the company.

References

Italian companies established in 1999
Companies based in Rome
Companies established in 1999
Government-owned companies of Italy
Partly privatized companies of Italy
Way